Rafael Santo Domingo Molina (born November 24, 1955 in Orocovis, Puerto Rico) is a retired Major League Baseball pinch hitter. He played during one season at the major league level for the Cincinnati Reds.

Formerly the hitting coach of the Pulaski Mariners, Santo Domingo is now an area scout based in Puerto Rico for the Seattle Mariners.

References

External links

1955 births
Living people
Billings Mustangs players
Cincinnati Reds players
Indianapolis Indians players
Major League Baseball players from Puerto Rico
Minor league baseball coaches
Nashville Sounds players
People from Orocovis, Puerto Rico
Puerto Rican expatriate baseball players in Canada
Seattle Mariners scouts
Tampa Tarpons (1957–1987) players
Trois-Rivières Aigles players